USA-156, also known as GPS IIR-7 and GPS SVN-54, is an American navigation satellite which forms part of the Global Positioning System. It was the seventh Block IIR GPS satellite to be launched, out of thirteen in the original configuration, and twenty one overall. It was built by Lockheed Martin, using the AS-4000 satellite bus.

USA-156 was launched at 07:55:01 UTC on 30 January 2001, atop a Delta II carrier rocket, flight number D283, flying in the 7925–9.5 configuration. The launch took place from Space Launch Complex 17A at the Cape Canaveral Air Force Station, and placed USA-156 into a transfer orbit. The satellite raised itself into medium Earth orbit using a Star-37FM apogee motor.

It is used to broadcast the PRN 18 signal, and operates in slot 4 of plane E of the GPS constellation. The satellite was retired in 2018.

References

Spacecraft launched in 2001
GPS satellites
USA satellites